The People's Alliance for Free Peace (NSSM) was a political alliance in Bosnia and Herzegovina.

History
Consisting of the Socialist Party, the Alliance of Independent Social Democrats, the Yugoslav Left and the New Workers' Party, the alliance contested the 1996 general election, but only in Republika Srpska. It finished third in Republika Srpska with 5.7% of the vote, winning two seats in the national House of Representatives. In the elections for the National Assembly of Republika Srpska, it won ten of the 83 seats.

The alliance did not contest any further elections.

References

Defunct political parties in Bosnia and Herzegovina
Political party alliances in Bosnia and Herzegovina
Political parties in Republika Srpska